Antonia Vila (1815 – 1870), was a Spanish printer and publisher.  

She published the first newspaper of Pontevedra from 1843, and has been referred to as the first newspaper editor and printer of Pontevedra.

References

1815 births
1870 deaths
19th-century Spanish businesspeople
19th-century publishers (people)
19th-century printers